The 2004–05 Illinois Fighting Illini men's basketball team marked the 100th season of men's basketball at the University of Illinois at Urbana–Champaign.  After starting the regular season with a record of 29–0 and winning the Big Ten Conference regular season title outright at 15–1, the Illini were Big Ten tournament champions. They advanced in the NCAA tournament to the national championship, marking the school's first appearance in the championship game, but lost to North Carolina, 75–70. They ended the season  tying the record for most victories in a season for a men's college basketball team.

In 2014, Sports Illustrated voted the 2005 Illinois team as the best ever not to win a national title.

Season

Overview
Illinois celebrated its 100th season of varsity basketball in 2004-05. In his second season as head coach at Illinois, Bruce Weber’s Illini put together the most successful season in U of I history. The Illini tied the all-time NCAA record for victories in a season with 37 wins en route to its 37–2 record (since surpassed by 2011–12 Kentucky with a 38–2 record and 2014–15 Kentucky with a 38–1 record). Illinois made its fifth all-time NCAA Final Four appearance and first since 1989. The Illini defeated Louisville in the national semifinal to advance to the championship game for the first time in school history. Illinois finished as the national runner-up, falling by five points to North Carolina in the title game.

Above all else, the team was noted for its impeccable ball movement on offense, and led the nation in assists.  A constant flow of passes allowed for open looks from the three-point line on every play.  Led by a three-guard starting lineup, the team did not rely upon sheer size and height like many other teams in order to dominate, but rather skill and teamwork.  Illinois relied upon three-point shooting for its offensive firepower.  Illinois' effective offense was largely attributable to the team chemistry that had developed amongst the starting five, which had gone unchanged over the two previous seasons.  Defensively, the team was one of the best at guarding against the three-point shot.  Illinois averaged 77.0 points per game, while allowing 61.1 points per game, for an average point differential of nearly 16 points.

In blowout home games,  senior Nick Smith, the tallest player in University of Illinois basketball history, would take three-point shots from the top of the key.  He made 4 of 11 on the season.

Regular season
The Illini started the season by setting a school record with 29 straight wins, the third best start in Big Ten history and tying the 12th best start in NCAA annals. Illinois won its second-ever game over a No. 1-ranked opponent, crushing Wake Forest 91-73 at the Assembly Hall on December 1. After the win, the Illini took over the number 1 overall spot in the national polls and held it for the remainder of the regular season, a run of 15 straight weeks.  On January 25, 2005, Illinois defeated Wisconsin 75-65 at the Kohl Center, snapping the Badgers' nation-leading 38-game home court winning streak.  In the process, Illinois handed the Badgers their first home court loss since a defeat to, coincidentally, Wake Forest, on December 4, 2002, and also assumed the nation's longest home court winning streak themselves.

Illinois was ranked No. 1 in the final Associated Press poll of 2005, another first for the program. The Illini then went on to win to its second straight outright Big Ten Championship with a 15-1 record, as Weber became the first coach in 100 years of Big Ten basketball to win consecutive outright league championships in his first two seasons.

Post-Season
The Illini won the Big Ten tournament, becoming just the second team to win both an outright Big Ten regular season title and the Big Ten tournament in the same season. In the NCAA tournament, the overall number 1 seeded Illini won their first three games by double digits.

In an Elite Eight matchup, Illinois fell behind early to the University of Arizona due to poor shooting behind the three-point line and sensational play by Arizona's leaders Salim Stoudamire and Channing Frye.  The game featured a 15-point comeback from the Illini, triggered by several steals and Deron Williams' clutch three-point shooting, including several NBA range threes, in the last 3 minutes and 30 seconds of the game.

The Illini then defeated The University of Louisville 72-57, the team's largest margin of victory in the tournament, to move on to the 2005 National Championship Game against North Carolina.

In the national championship game, Illinois was defeated by North Carolina 70-75.  North Carolina relied upon stellar post play from Sean May, who managed to get James Augustine and Jack Ingram into foul trouble, while Illinois struggled offensively with what had succeeded the rest of the season, converting only 12 of a championship game record 40 three-point field goal attempts. James Augustine played 9 minutes due to foul trouble, forcing Jack Ingram to play a huge role in the second half comeback the Illini made. For almost the entire season, Illinois was ranked #1 and North Carolina was ranked #2, respectively, in all polls, and both teams were the favorites to meet in the national championship game.  The North Carolina squad would go on to field six players in the NBA draft.

Accolades
Bruce Weber was named National Coach of the Year by nine organizations. Dee Brown, "The One Man Fast Break", was named The Sporting News National Player of the Year and swept the conference honors as well, being named both Big Ten Player of the Year and Big Ten Defensive Player of the Year. The Illini had three players earn consensus All-America honors in the same season for the first time ever. In addition to Brown earning consensus first-team All-America honors, Deron Williams and Luther Head were named consensus second-team All-Americans. Following the season, both Williams and Head were chosen in the first round of the NBA draft, with Head being drafted No. 24 overall by the Houston Rockets while Williams became the highest Illinois player ever drafted when he was chosen No. 3 overall by the Utah Jazz.

Team

Roster

Depth chart

Injuries
Freshman Brian Randle took a medical redshirt after punching a wall in frustration and breaking his hand during preseason practice.

Records

Schedule

|-
!colspan=12 style="background:#DF4E38; color:white;"| Exhibition

|-
!colspan=12 style="background:#DF4E38; color:white;"| Non-Conference regular season

|-
!colspan=9 style="background:#DF4E38; color:#FFFFFF;"|Big Ten regular season

|-
!colspan=9 style="text-align: center; background:#DF4E38"|Big Ten tournament

|-
!colspan=9 style="text-align: center; background:#DF4E38"|NCAA tournament

Rankings

Season Statistics

Awards and honors
James Augustine
Big Ten tournament Most Outstanding Player
Dee Brown
Consensus All-American 1st team
United States Basketball Writers Association 1st team All-American 
Sporting News National Player of the Year 
Big Ten Player of the Year 
Chicago Tribune Silver Basketball 
Big Ten Defensive Player of the Year  
Associated Press 2nd team All-American 
National Basketball Coaches Association 2nd team All-American
Team Co-Most Valuable Player 
Luther Head
Consensus All-American 2nd team
Associated Press 2nd team All-American 
United States Basketball Writers Association 1st team All-American
National Basketball Coaches Association 2nd team All-American 
NCAA Final Four All-Tournament Team
Team Co-Most Valuable Player 
Deron Williams
Consensus All-American 2nd team 
National Basketball Coaches Association 2nd team All-American
Sporting News 2nd team All-American 
Associated Press 3rd team All-American
NCAA Final Four All-Tournament Team
NCAA Tournament Regional Most Outstanding Player
Team Co-Most Valuable Player 
Bruce Weber
National Coach of the Year
Big Ten Coach of the Year

Team players drafted into the NBA

References

External links
 Season statistics

Illinois Fighting Illini
Illinois Fighting Illini men's basketball seasons
Illinois
NCAA Division I men's basketball tournament Final Four seasons
Big Ten men's basketball tournament championship seasons
Illinois
Illinois